The Naked Truth is a 1914 silent Italian drama film directed by Carmine Gallone.

Cast
 Lyda Borelli as Lolette
 Ruggero Capodaglio
 Wanda Capodaglio as Principessa
 Lamberto Picasso as Pierre Bernier
 Ugo Piperno as Rouchard

See also
 The Nude Woman (1922)
 The Nude Woman (1926)
 The Nude Woman (1932)

References

External links
 

1914 films
1914 drama films
Italian silent feature films
Italian black-and-white films
Films directed by Carmine Gallone
Italian films based on plays
Italian drama films
Silent drama films